Ledu may refer to:

Ledu District, Haidong, Qinghai, China
Ledu (prince) (1636–1655), Prince Min of the Second Rank of the Qing dynasty

See also
Leduc (disambiguation)